This article lists the results for the China women's national football team since 2020.

2020

2021

2022

References

External links
Official match results of China, theCFA.cn 

2020–2029
2020s in China
2020 in Chinese football
2021 in Chinese football
2023 in Chinese football